Conroy Black (born October 31, 1988) is a current NFL Free Agent. Black played college football for the Utah Utes. Black was undrafted in the 2012 NFL Draft.

Professional career

Oakland Raiders
After going unpicked in the 2012 NFL Draft, Black signed a free agent contract with the Oakland Raiders on May 11, 2012. He was waived on August 29, 2012.

Detroit Lions
On September 18, 2012, Black was signed to the Detroit Lions practice squad, where he spent all of the 2012 season.

Black signed a futures contract with the Detroit Lions on January 1, 2013. Black was released by the Detroit Lions on May 16, 2013.

Kansas City Chiefs
On July 26, 2013, Black signed with the Kansas City Chiefs. On August 6, 2013, he was waived by the Chiefs.

Detroit Lions
On August 13, 2013, Black was signed by the Detroit Lions. On August 16, 2013, he was released by the Lions.

Los Angeles Kiss
Black signed with the Los Angeles Kiss on February 3, 2014. He was placed on reassignment on March 28, 2014. He later attended rookie mini-camp with the Carolina Panthers, but was not signed.

References

External links

Detroit Lions bio
Utah Utes bio

1988 births
Living people
Players of American football from Florida
American football cornerbacks
Utah Utes football players
Detroit Lions players
Kansas City Chiefs players
Los Angeles Kiss players
Mesquite Marshals players